The Phloeodictyidae are a family of sponges containing the following genera:
 Calyx Vosmaer, 1885
 Oceanapia Norman, 1869
 Pachypellina Burton, 1934
 Siphonodictyon Bergquist, 1965
 Tabulocalyx Pulitzer-Finali, 1993

References

Petrosina